HMS Alcide (P415), was an  of the Royal Navy, built by Vickers-Armstrongs and launched 12 April 1945.

Design
Like all Amphion-class submarines, Alcide had a displacement of  when at the surface and  while submerged. The submarine was powered by two Admiralty ML eight-cylinder diesel engines generating a power of  each. It also contained four electric motors each producing  that drove two shafts.

Alcide was fitted with ten  torpedo tubes, one QF 4 inch naval gun Mk XXIII, one Oerlikon 20 mm cannon, and a .303 British Vickers machine gun. Its torpedo tubes were fitted to the bow and stern, and it could carry twenty torpedoes. Its complement was sixty-one crew members.

Service
In 1952 Alcide deployed to Canada for anti-submarine training with the Royal Canadian Navy. In 1968 she took part in Navy Days at Portsmouth.

References

Publications

External links
 Pictures of HMS Alcide at MaritimeQuest

 

Amphion-class submarines
Cold War submarines of the United Kingdom
Ships built in Barrow-in-Furness
1945 ships